SS British Sergeant was a British tanker built by Palmers Shipbuilding and Iron Company in 1922 and operated by the British Tanker Company. She was sunk during World War II on 9 April 1942 during the Indian Ocean raid, off Batticaloa, Ceylon, by Imperial Japanese Navy aircraft.

Footnotes

References

World War II merchant ships of the United Kingdom
World War II shipwrecks in the Indian Ocean
Maritime incidents in April 1942
Ships sunk by Japanese aircraft
1922 ships
Ships built on the River Tyne